The Central Library of Rotterdam is one of the largest libraries in the Netherlands.  It has more than 2.4 million visitors annually and is the most visited cultural institution in Rotterdam.

Muziekwebplein
Muziekwebplein, formerly Centrale Discotheek Rotterdam (CDR, Central Music Library of Rotterdam), is the music library of Rotterdam's library. Its website, Muziekweb, gives access to the music library's collection. It has been described as:

References

External links
 

Public libraries in the Netherlands